Phaloe lorzae is a moth in the subfamily Arctiinae. It was described by Jean Baptiste Boisduval in 1870. It is found in Guatemala.

References

Moths described in 1870
Arctiinae